Tablshekin (also Romanized as Ţablshekīn, Ţablashgīn, and Ţablshekan) is a village in Hesar-e Valiyeasr Rural District, Central District, Avaj County, Qazvin Province, Iran. At the 2006 census, its population was 363, in 80 families. This village is populated by Azerbaijani Turks.

References 

Populated places in Avaj County